Marek Tomaszewski (born 20 November 1943 in Kraków) is a Polish pianist. He was one half of the pianist duo Marek and Wacek with Wacław Kisielewski from 1963 until his death on 12 July 1986. He is the father of French music video director David Tomaszewski.

Discography

With Marek and Wacek

Long plays
 1966 – Ballade pour deux pianos Barclay
 1968
 Kisielewski-Tomaszewski: Play Favourite Melodies (Pronit; CD re-release by Muza in 1994)
 Marek & Vacek: Piano Firework (Polydor)
 Marek & Vacek: Romanische Figel (Polydor)
 Marek & Vacek: Träumerei (Polydor)
 1969
 Marek & Vacek: Piano Fascination (Polydor)
 Marek & Vacek: Piano Firework, Vol. 1-2 (Polydor)
 1970 – Marek & Vacek: Classical and Pop Pianos (Polydor)
 1971 – Marek & Vacek: Stargala, Vol. 1-2 (Polydor)
 1972 – Marek & Vacek: Concert Hits (Electrola)
 1973
 Marek & Vacek: Concert Hits II (Electrola)
 Marek & Vacek: Concert Hits, Vol. 1-2 (Electrola)
 1974 – Marek und Vacek Live: Vol. 1-2 (Electrola)
 1976 – Marek und Vacek: Spectrum (Electrola)
 1977 – Marek & Vacek: Wiener Walzer (Electrola)
 1978 – Marek und Vacek: Das Programm (Polydor)
 1979
 Marek und Vacek, Vol. 1-2 (Polydor)
 Marek & Vacek Live (Wifon)
 1980 – Marek & Vacek: Mondscheinsonate (Polydor)
 1981
 Marek i wacek grają utwory romantyczne (Veriton)
 Marek und Vacek in Gold (Polydor)
 1982 – Die Marek und Vacek Story 1962-1982, Vol. 1-2 (Prisma)
 1984
 Marek und Vacek '84 (Intercord)
 Marek i Vacek (Wifon)
 Marek und Vacek: Welterfolge (Intercord)
 Marek and Vacek: Again (Pronit)
 1987 – Marek & Vacek: The Last Concert, Vol. 1-2 (Pronit)

Compact discs
 1994 – Kisielewski - Tomaszewski: Play Favourite Melodies (Muza)
 2001 – Niepokonani: Marek & Vacek Live (Polskie Radio/Universal Music Polska)
 2002 – Prząśniczka (Pomaton/EMI)

Solo discography
 2004 – Premiere (MCP)
 2008 – Rapsodia (Seychelles)
 2010 – Le Sacre du Printemps (The Rite of Spring by Igor Stravinsky) (Agora)
 2013 – Ballade pour Michelle (Seychelles)

Other ventures
Tomaszewski appeared on the 2009 film Coco Chanel & Igor Stravinsky as the principal pianist alongside his son David, who was the principal violinist, and accompanied French rapper Orelsan on his video "Les vœux de RaelSan pour 2012" ("RaelSan's Wishes for 2012") as the pianist, again directed by his son David.

Filmography

Film

Television

References

External links
 
 

1943 births
Living people
Musicians from Kraków
Polish classical pianists
Male classical pianists
Polish jazz pianists
21st-century classical pianists
21st-century male musicians